Marxist cultural analysis is a form of cultural analysis and anti-capitalist cultural critique, which assumes the theory of cultural hegemony and from this specifically targets those aspects of culture which are profit driven and mass-produced under capitalism.

The original theory behind this form of analysis is commonly associated with Georg Lukacs, the Frankfurt School, and Antonio Gramsci, representing an important tendency within Western Marxism. Marxist cultural analysis, taken as an area of discourse, has commonly considered the industrialization and mass-production of culture by the "culture industry" as having an overall negative effect on society, an effect which reifies the reactions of the audience, driving them away from developing a more authentic sense of human values.

The tradition of Marxist cultural analysis has occasionally also been referred to as "cultural Marxism", and "Marxist Cultural theory", in reference to Marxist ideas about culture. However, since the 1990s, the term "Cultural Marxism" has largely referred to the Cultural Marxism conspiracy theory, an influential discourse on the far right without any clear relationship to Marxist cultural analysis.

Development of theory

Antonio Gramsci 
Antonio Gramsci was an Italian Marxist philosopher, primarily writing in the lead up to and after the First World War. He attempted to break from the economic determinism of classical Marxism thought and so is considered a key neo-Marxist.

Gramsci is best known for his theory of cultural hegemony, which describes how the state and the bourgeoisie as the ruling capitalist class use cultural institutions to maintain power in capitalist societies. In Gramsci's view, the bourgeoisie develops a hegemonic culture using ideology rather than violence, economic force, or coercion. Hegemonic culture propagates its own values and norms so that they become the "common sense" values of all and maintain the status quo. Gramsci asserted that hegemonic power is used to maintain consent to the capitalist order rather than coercive power using force to maintain order and that this cultural hegemony is produced and reproduced by the dominant class through the institutions that form the superstructure.

Birmingham School 
E. P. Thompson's Marxist humanism as well as the individual philosophies of the founders of the Birmingham School (Stuart Hall, Richard Hoggart and Raymond Williams) provide the influences for British Cultural Studies as housed at the Centre for Contemporary Cultural Studies in Birmingham. The Birmingham School developed later than the Frankfurt School and are seen as providing a parallel response. Accordingly, British Cultural Studies focuses on later issues such as Americanization, censorship, globalization and multiculturalism. Hoggart's The Uses of Literacy (1957), Williams' Culture and Society (1958) and Thompson's The Making of the English Working class (1964) form the foundational texts for the school, with Hall's encoding/decoding model of communication as well as his writings on multiculturalism in Britain arriving later but carrying equal gravitas.

The Birmingham School greatly valued and contributed to class consciousness within the structure of British society. Due to their positions as literary experts, Hoggart and Williams were called as witnesses during R v Penguin Books Ltd, a court case concerning censorship in publishing, the outcome of which is widely regarded as defining Britain in the 1960s as a "permissive society". They argued on the side of freedom of language and against censorship.

Within Hoggart's major work, The Uses of Literacy, he laments the loss of an authentic working class popular culture in Britain, and denounces the imposition of a mass culture by means of advertising, media and Americanisation. He argues against the concept of 'the masses' which he claims is both condescending and elitist. Later referring to this change in cultural production as "massification" and saying it "colonized local communities and robbed them of their distinctive features." Whereas the Frankfurt School exhorted the values of high culture, the Birmingham School attempted to bring high culture back down to real life whilst avoiding moral relativism.

Critique of identity politics and postmodernism 
Within more recent history, Marxist cultural analysis has critiqued postmodernism and identity politics, also known as recognition politics, claiming that redistributive politics should retain prominence within their discourse. Jürgen Habermas, an academic philosopher associated with the Frankfurt School, is a critic of the theories of postmodernism, having presented cases against their style and structure in his work "The Philosophical Discourse of Modernity", in which he outlays the importance of communicative rationality and action. He also makes the case that by being founded on and from within modernity, postmodernism has internal contradictions which make it unsustainable as an argument.

Frankfurt School Associate, Nancy Fraser, has made critiques of modern identity politics and feminism in her New Left Review article "Rethinking Recognition", as well as in her collection of essays "Fortunes of Feminism: From State-Managed Capitalism to Neoliberal Crisis" (1985–2010).

"Cultural Marxism" conspiracy theory 

While the term "cultural Marxism" has been used in a general sense, to discuss the application of Marxist ideas in the cultural field, the variant term "Cultural Marxism" generally refers to an antisemitic conspiracy theory. 
Parts of the conspiracy theory make reference to actual thinkers and ideas selected from the Western Marxist tradition, but they severely misrepresent the subject. Conspiracy theorists exaggerate the actual influence of Marxist intellectuals, for example, claiming that Marxist scholars aimed to infiltrate governments, perform mind-control over populations, and destroy Western civilization. Since there is no specific movement corresponding to the label, Joan Braune has argued it is not correct to use the term "Cultural Marxism" at all.

In Norway, Anders Behring Breivik quoted the conspiracy usage of "Cultural Marxism" in his political manifesto 2083: A European Declaration of Independence, which he emailed to 1,003 people just 90 minutes before killing 77 people in his bomb and gun attacks in Oslo and on Utøya. In more mainstream political parlance, cultural conservatives claim to have identified "Cultural Marxism" as the theoretical basis for aspects of cultural liberalism.

See also 

 Critical consciousness
 Critical theory
 Cultural hegemony
 Cultural materialism
 Cultural studies
 Hermeneutics of suspicion
 Marxist literary criticism
 Mass communication
 Media literacy
 Neo-Marxism
 New Left
 Post-Marxism
 Post-structuralism
 Psychopolitical validity
 Radical politics
 Structuralism
 Structure and agency
 Western Marxism

References 

Cultural studies
Marxism